Bagh Sanja, also known as Bagh Sanjari or Goth Bara Bagh, is a village in Lasbela District, Balochistan, Pakistan.

Populated places in Lasbela District